Heron Island is a small island of approximately 129 acres in the Saint Lawrence River and part of Sainte-Catherine, Quebec, Canada. The northern tip of the island is located in the Lachine rapids. It is one of "Saint-Laurent, Vision 2000" 37 protected sites. In 2002, Hydro Quebec donated the land to The Nature Conservancy of Canada (NCC) which manages the site as a wildlife reserve.

Federal migratory bird sanctuary
In 1937, the island along with nearby Goat, The Seven Sisters, Devil's, and Boquet Islands were collectively granted status as a federal migratory bird sanctuary under its official name of Ile aux Hérons Migratory Bird Sanctuary. Hence its namesake, the island currently (2010) hosts Quebec's 2nd largest colony of Great Blue Herons. Other nesting birds include the Black-crowned Night Heron, Great Egret and numerous others.

Around 2000 it was thought that 3 White-tailed Deer arrived on the island either by swimming or by crossing over ice in the winter. Due to the lack of natural predators an aerial survey in 2012 estimated their population at approximately 46. Much of the vegetation was showing stress and in 2014 permission was granted for a controlled hunt of 10-12 individuals by arrows only.

28 private seasonal cottages are present, mainly concentrated on the eastern tip away from nesting sites. No services, roads, or ferries are available.

References 
 http://www.planstlaurent.qc.ca/slv2000/plan_action/phase2/biodiversite/habitats/herons_a.htm Saint-Laurent, Vision 2000, Phase II-Habitat Reports, Île aux Hérons
 http://www.montrealgazette.com/technology/hunters+killing+deer+with+arrows+montreal+h%C3%A9rons/10304478/story.html
 https://www.canada.ca/en/environment-climate-change/services/migratory-bird-sanctuaries/locations/ile-aux-herons.html#toc4

Hochelaga Archipelago
Roussillon Regional County Municipality
River islands of Quebec
Landforms of Montérégie